Fahad Nawaz (15 January 2000) is a cricketer who plays for the United Arab Emirates national cricket team. He made his One Day International (ODI) debut for the United Arab Emirates against Nepal on 25 January 2019. In December 2020, he was one of ten cricketers to be awarded with a year-long part-time contract by the Emirates Cricket Board.

In September 2022, he was named in the United Arab Emirates squad for the 2022 ICC Men's T20 World Cup. He made his T20I debut on 20 October 2022, against Namibia.

References

External links
 

2000 births
Living people
Emirati cricketers
United Arab Emirates One Day International cricketers
United Arab Emirates Twenty20 International cricketers
Sportspeople from Dubai
Pakistani expatriate sportspeople in the United Arab Emirates